Carlo Zucchi (February 1789, in Reggio Emilia – 9 September 1849) was an Italian architect.

A nephew of the namesake Italian general, Zucchi studied in Paris. Later he was active in the River Plate basin.

Selected works 
 Mausoleum of Manuel Dorrego, La Recoleta Cemetery
 Façade of the Cathedral of Santa Fe, Argentina
 Façade of the Cathedral of Buenos Aires
 Design of Plaza Independencia, Montevideo, in 1836
 Central Cemetery of Montevideo
 Teatro Solís, Montevideo
 Hospital Maciel (part)
 Church at Coronda, Province of Santa Fe

Literature

References 

People from Reggio Emilia
1789 births
1849 deaths
19th-century Italian architects